The Saint Meinrad Seminary and School of Theology is a Roman Catholic seminary and school of theology in Saint Meinrad, Indiana. It is affiliated with the Saint Meinrad Archabbey in St. Meinrad, Indiana. The institution was named after Meinrad of Einsiedeln, a ninth century hermit living in what is today Switzerland.

History 

In 1857, several Benedictine monks travelled from Einsiedeln Abbey in Einsiedeln, Switzerland, to southern Indiana to establish Saint Meinrad Seminary. At its beginning, Saint Meinrad was a high school program.  By 1861, the monks had added courses in philosophy, business, theology and classical literature. A fire in 1887 destroyed the seminary buildings.

When Saint Meinrad reopened after the 1887 fire, it focused only on preparing seminarians for priesthood.  It had two divisions:

 A minor seminary with four years of high school and the first two years of college
 A major seminary with two years of college courses in philosophy and theology

In 1959, Saint Meinrad reorganized into three divisions:

 A traditional four year high school, which closed in 1968.
 A four-year college, which closed in 1998.
 A theologate, or graduate school of theology

In February 2019, after an internal investigation, Saint Meinrad added two priests to the Diocese of Evansville list of clergy with credible accusations of sexual abuse:

 Warren Heitz was accused of misconduct dating from the 1970s and 1999. Removed from public ministry in 2002, he spent ten years living in a supervised residence for offenders at Saint Meinrad.
 Robert Woerdeman had faced one accusation of misconduct. He was defrocked as a priest in 1975.

Academics 

Saint Meinrad offers the following advanced degrees:

 Master of Divinity
 Master of Theological Studies 
 Master of Arts in Catholic Philosophical Studies
 Master of Arts (Theology) 
 Master of Arts (Pastoral Theology)

Saint Meinrad offers programs in:

 Priesthood formation 
 Theological formation for permanent deacon candidates 
 Lay degrees in theology 
 Continuing adult education 
 Youth leadership

Saint Meinrad is accredited by the Association of Theological Schools. It has also been accredited by the Higher Learning Commission or its predecessor, the North Central Association of Colleges and Schools, continuously since 1979.

Alumni

Ordinaries
Archbishop Daniel M. Buechlein, Bishop Emeritus, Archdiocese of Indianapolis
Father Ralph S. Pfau, author

Deceased alumni cardinals

Joseph Cardinal Ritter, O'1917; Archdiocese of St. Louis

Living alumni bishops

Paul J. Bradley, DD, O'1971; Diocese of Kalamazoo
J. Douglas Deshotel, DD, O`1978; Diocese of Dallas - Auxiliary
Robert W. Donnelly, DD, O'1957; Diocese of Toledo - Auxiliary (retired)
Gerald A. Gettelfinger, DD, O'1961; Diocese of Evansville (retired)
Joseph H. Hart, DD, O'1956; Diocese of Cheyenne (retired)
James Vann Johnston, DD, T'1990; Diocese of Kansas City-St. Joseph
Peter A. Libasci, DD, O'1977; Diocese of Manchester
William F. Medley, DD, O'1982; Diocese of Owensboro
Carl F. Mengeling, STD, O'1957; Diocese of Lansing (retired)
Thomas J. O'Brien, DD, O'1961; Diocese of Phoenix (resigned)
Patrick Pinder, DD, O'1979; Archdiocese of Nassau
David L. Ricken, DD, O'1980; Diocese of Green Bay
João Noé Rodrigues (Sabbaticant 1993); Diocese of Tzaneen, South Africa
James Peter Sartain, DD, O'1978; Archdiocese of Seattle
Joseph M. Siegel, STL, O'1988; Diocese of Evansville
David P. Talley T`1989; Diocese of Memphis
Anthony B. Taylor, DD, O'1980; Diocese of Little Rock
Charles C. Thompson, DD, T'1987; Archdiocese of Indianapolis

Deceased alumni bishops

Herman J. Alerding, O'1868; Diocese of Fort Wayne
John G. Bennett, O'1914; Diocese of Lafayette-in-Indiana
William D. Borders, DD, O'1940; Archdiocese of Baltimore
Joseph Chartrand, O'1892; Diocese of Indianapolis
Francis R. Cotton, O'1920 Diocese of Owensboro
Joseph R. Crowley, O'1953; Diocese of Fort Wayne-South Bend (Auxiliary Emeritus)
Laurence J. FitzSimon, O'1921; Diocese of Amarillo
James R. Hoffman, O'1958; Diocese of Toledo
E. B. Ledvina, O'1893; Diocese of Corpus Christi
Thomas F. Lillis, O'1885; Diocese Kansas City, MO
Denis O'Donaghue, O'1874; Diocese of Louisville (Emeritus)
Theodore Revermann, O'1901; Diocese of Superior
John C. Ward, O'1884; Diocese of Leavenworth

Others
Luke Timothy Johnson, Ph.D., author and professor at the Candler School of Emory University.
Fr. Thomas Scecina, US Army chaplain killed during the sinking of the Japanese prison ship Arisan Maru in 1944
Fr. Cyprian Davis, OSB, Black Catholic historian and the first African-American to join the St Meinrad monks.

References

External links

Catholic seminaries in the United States
Roman Catholic Archdiocese of Indianapolis
Educational institutions established in 1857
Education in Spencer County, Indiana
Catholic universities and colleges in Indiana
1857 establishments in Indiana